2244 Tesla, provisional designation , is a carbonaceous asteroid from the central region of the asteroid belt, approximately 25 kilometers in diameter. It was discovered on 22 October 1952, by Serbian astronomer Milorad Protić at the Belgrade Observatory, then Federal People's Republic of Yugoslavia, now Serbia. It is named after the inventor Nikola Tesla.

Orbit 

Tesla orbits the Sun in the central main-belt at a distance of 2.3–3.3 AU once every 4 years and 9 months (1,721 days). Its orbit has an eccentricity of 0.18 and an inclination of 8° with respect to the ecliptic.

Physical characteristics 

In the SMASS taxonomy, Tesla is a dark C-type asteroid. According to the survey carried out by NASA's Wide-field Infrared Survey Explorer with its subsequent NEOWISE mission, Tesla measures 24.37 kilometers in diameter and its surface has a low albedo of 0.050, in correspondence with its carbonaceous composition. A larger diameter estimate of 29 kilometers was obtained in 2008, from an asteroid occultation.

Lightcurves 

As of 2017, Teslas rotation period and shape remains unknown.

Naming 

This minor planet was named in memory of Serbian-American electrical engineer and inventor Nikola Tesla (1856–1943). He is best known for his contributions to the design of the modern alternating current (AC) electricity supply system. The lunar crater Tesla is also named in his honor. The approved naming citation was published by the Minor Planet Center on 7 March 1985.

References

External links 
 Asteroid Lightcurve Database (LCDB), query form (info )
 Dictionary of Minor Planet Names, Google books
 Asteroids and comets rotation curves, CdR – Observatoire de Genève, Raoul Behrend
 Discovery Circumstances: Numbered Minor Planets (1)-(5000) – Minor Planet Center
 
 

002244
Discoveries by Milorad B. Protić
Named minor planets
002244
19521022